Labi Siffre is the self-titled debut album by British musician Labi Siffre, released in 1970. It was recorded and produced by Ian Green.

The album was re-released on CD in 2006 by EMI featuring an additional six bonus tracks and liner notes by Siffre.

Track listing
All songs written and performed Labi Siffre except "Words" (written by the Bee Gees) and "Maybe" (by Harry Nilsson).
 "Too Late" – 3:17
 "Words" – 2:22
 "Something on My Mind" – 2:38
 "Maybe Tomorrow" – 3:41
 "You and I Should Be Together" – 3:01
 "I Don't Know What's Happened to the Kids Today" – 3:14
 "I Love You" – 2:35
 "Make My Day" – 3:04
 "A Little More Line" – 3:45
 "Maybe" – 2:49
 "River" – 2:21
 "Love Song for Someone" - 2:47

Bonus tracks on 2006 CD reissue
 "Why Did You Go, Why Did You Leave Me" - 3:16
 "I Just Couldn't Live Without Her" - 2:38
 "Last Night Tonight" - 4:06
 "Maybe When We Dance" - 4:04
 "Ask Me to Stay" - 3:53
 "Here We Are" - 2:40

References

1970 debut albums
Labi Siffre albums
EMI Records albums